The  is a museum located in Gifu Park in the city of Gifu, Gifu Prefecture, Japan. It is dedicated to the works of the brothers Eizō and Tōichi Katō, who were born in the city. It is part of the Gifu City Museum of History.

Facility layout
The facility was built with reinforced concrete for its base and wooden supports for the walls.

Facilities information
Hours of operation
9:00am to 5:00pm (entry until 4:30pm)
Holidays
Mondays (Tuesday, if Monday is a holiday)
Day after national holidays
Dec. 29 to Jan. 3
Entrance fee
{| class="wikitable"
|-
! 
! Individual Rate
! Group Rate
|-
| Adult
| 300 yen
| 240 yen
|-
| Child
| 150 yen
| 90 yen
|}
Group discounts are available to parties of 20 or larger.
Those over 70 years of age are allowed free admission.

Access
From JR Gifu Station (Bus Platform 11) or Meitetsu Gifu Station (Bus Platform 4), board any bus towards Nagara. Get off the bus at "Gifu Koen, Rekishi Hakubutsukan-mae," approximately 15 minutes from the train stations. The museum is a five-minute walk from there.

External links
Museum Homepage 

Buildings and structures in Gifu
Museums in Gifu Prefecture
Art museums and galleries in Japan
Art museums established in 1991
1991 establishments in Japan